Jujubinus guanchus is a species of sea snail, a marine gastropod mollusk in the family Trochidae, the top snails.

The species is named after the Guanche people who once inhabited the Canary Islands.

Description
The height of the shell attains 5 mm.

Distribution
This species occurs in the Atlantic Ocean off the Canary Islands.

References

External links
 

guanchus
Gastropods described in 1985
Molluscs of the Canary Islands
Molluscs of the Atlantic Ocean